Chronic deciduitis is a type of long-lasting inflammation that arises in pregnancy and affects the endometrial stromal tissue (decidua).

It is associated with preterm labour.  The diagnosis rests primarily on the presence of plasma cells.

See also
Chorioamnionitis
Decidua

References

External links 

Inflammations
Pathology of pregnancy, childbirth and the puerperium